51 Market Street, also known as the William and Rosamond Clark House, is a historic house located between Madison and Monroe Streets in lower Manhattan in New York City. The two-story gambrelled house was built in 1824–25 in the late Federal style at a time when the Lower East Side was an affluent residential neighborhood. The original owner was apparently William Clark, a grocer. The upper two stories were added late in the 19th century.  The house has been described as a "superb" example of the Federal style.

51 Market Street was designated a New York City landmark in 1965, and was added to the National Register of Historic Places in 1977.

See also
National Register of Historic Places listings in Manhattan below 14th Street
List of New York City Designated Landmarks in Manhattan below 14th Street

References
Notes

 

Houses on the National Register of Historic Places in Manhattan
Federal architecture in New York (state)
Houses completed in 1824
Houses in Manhattan
New York City Designated Landmarks in Manhattan
Chinatown, Manhattan